I Predict a Graceful Expulsion is the debut album by Cold Specks

The album was named as a long-listed nominee for the 2012 Polaris Music Prize on June 14, 2012.

Track listing
 The Mark
 Heavy Hands
 Winter Solstice
 When the City Lights Dim
 Hector
 Holland
 Elephant Head
 Send Your Youth
 Blank Maps
 Steady
 Lay Me Down

References

2012 debut albums
Mute Records albums
Arts & Crafts Productions albums
Cold Specks albums